Vicky Hurst (born June 19, 1990) is an American professional golfer currently playing on the LPGA Tour.

She turned professional as a 17-year-old in 2008, while still in high school. Playing on the Futures Tour that year, she won five times and set a Tour record for single season earnings with $93,107.

Childhood and family life
Hurst was born to a golfing family. While pregnant with Vicky, her mother Koko, a native Korean, was completing a round of golf at Andrews AFB near Washington, D.C. when her water broke on the 16th hole.  Although winning the round, Koko left to give birth to Vicky at the base's medical center.  Her father, Joe, who met Koko while he was stationed in Korea in the 1980s, was a retired Air Force colonel. He died suddenly of a massive stroke in April 2006 while Vicky, age 15, was practicing for the LPGA Ginn Open to which she had received a sponsor exemption. Hurst withdrew from the tournament and said she would dedicate the rest of her career to her father's memory.
Hurst was raised in Melbourne, Florida, where she attended Holy Trinity Episcopal Academy and graduated in June 2008, part-way through her Futures Tour rookie year.  She has an older sister, Kelly, also an accomplished golfer, was a member of the University of Florida golf team, though she never played.

Amateur career
Hurst had a standout amateur career. In 2005, she won the Florida Women's State Golf Association Junior Girls' Championship, was named the FWSGA Junior Player of the Year and finished second at the Florida high school girls golf championship. In 2006, she was runner-up at the U.S. Girls' Junior and tied for second at the FWSGA Junior Girls' Championship. Also in 2006, she played in the U.S. Women's Open, less than two weeks after turning 16.
She was named Florida Junior Player of the Year in 2006-07 and qualified again for the U.S. Women's Open in 2007. In 2007, she won three American Junior Golf Association (AJGA) events, and earned spots on the 2007 U.S. PING Junior Solheim Cup Team and Canon Cup, representing the East Team. She ended 2007 as the top-ranked amateur in the Polo Golf Rankings and was named the 2007 AJGA Player of the Year.

Professional career
In the fall of 2007 at the start of her senior year in high school, Hurst faced a choice between pursuing a college golf career, for which she was heavily recruited by coaches, and turning professional. She participated in, and won, the Futures Tour qualifying school in November. In December she announced that she would skip college and join the Futures Tour in 2008, while completing high school at the same time. She also received sponsor exemptions to three LPGA Tour events in 2008, missing the cut in two of the events and finishing tied for 21st in the third.

In 2008, she competed full-time on the Futures Tour, winning five times and setting a Tour record for single season earnings with $93,107. She was named Rookie of the Year and Player of the Year and automatically qualified for full playing status on the LPGA Tour for the 2009 season.  Her first tournament as an LPGA member was the 2009 season-opening SBS Open at Turtle Bay at which she finished tied for 15th and led the field in driving distance.  Hurst finished her rookie year leading the LPGA Tour in driving distance with an average distance of 272.5 yards.

Hurst's endorsement contracts include Callaway Golf and Under Armour.

Professional wins (8)

Symetra Tour wins (8)

1 unofficial victory and earnings
Futures Tour majors are shown in bold.

Results in LPGA majors
Results not in chronological order before 2015.

^ The Evian Championship was added as a major in 2013.

CUT = missed the half-way cut
T = tied

Summary

Most consecutive cuts made – 6 (2009 British Open – 2011 Kraft Nabisco)
Longest streak of top-10s – 0

LPGA Tour career summary

 official through the 2022 season
* Includes matchplay and other events without a cut.

Futures Tour career summary

^ Does not include victory and $21,000 won at Duramed Invitational, an unofficial event after the season on October 19.

Team appearances
Amateur
Junior Ryder Cup (representing the United States): 2006
Junior Solheim Cup (representing the United States): 2007

Professional
Solheim Cup (representing the United States): 2011

Solheim Cup record

References

External links

Vicky Hurst at Seoul Sisters website

American female golfers
LPGA Tour golfers
Solheim Cup competitors for the United States
Golfers from Maryland
Golfers from Florida
American sportspeople of Korean descent
Holy Trinity Episcopal Academy alumni
People from Prince George's County, Maryland
People from Melbourne, Florida
1990 births
Living people
21st-century American women